Syndal High School (also known as Syndal Secondary School) was a public secondary school located in Glen Waverley, Victoria, Australia.

History 
With rapid postwar population growth to the east of Melbourne, various State and Federal Governments recognised the need to provide suitable educational facilities. Many of these suburbs provided affordable accommodation and were thus popular with returning World War II servicemen. In Syndal, housing was often on subdivided farmland and relatively cheap. Many new residents were also immigrants displaced by the War in Europe. From 1947 the Shire's population grew by 2000 a year to 1954, and then by 3000 a year to reach just under 45,000 in 1961, the year that Mulgrave became the City of Waverley (Monash since 1995).

It was quickly realised that the children of these servicemen, would need suitable government-funded Primary and Secondary educational facilities. Syndal High School was opened in 1967.

Architecture 
The school buildings at Syndal were the 'C-800' style, popular in Victoria through the late 1960s and early 1970s (surviving examples of this style can be found at Westernport Secondary College and the Banksia campus of Keysborough Secondary College). The design consists of a rectangular compound formed from inward-facing classrooms, this compound enclosing a pair of hexagonal-shaped buildings, one a library, and the other a flexible-use cluster of classrooms with an internal hexagonal, highly functional drama room in the centre of the cluster. The latter 'hexagon' was designed to enable internal walls to be temporarily reconfigured, allowing for team-teaching of larger groups, or other collaborative activities. This functionality has now been reproduced in Glen Waverley Secondary College's Middle School Building, where the reconfigurable classroom design supports Enquiry Learning pedagogies.

Decline and closure 
In the late 1980s under the 'District Provision' (a program that tied funding to enrolment numbers and forced schools to compete with nearby schools to survive), Victorian State Premier Joan Kirner’s rationale was that small schools were unable to offer an adequate curriculum.  Subsequently, the new Liberal government of Premier Jeff Kennett from 1992 accelerated Kirner's program through a 'Quality Provision'. This delivered $350 million in savings to the education budget but closed 350 schools and removed 9,000 teachers. Syndal High School was one of those closed.

The following extract from the Monash City Council explains the reasoning behind the closure of Syndal High School and others:
Just as new schools are characteristic of new suburbs, so the closing of schools is characteristic of ageing suburbs. By the 1990s the children born in Waverley in the boom years of growth were long grown and most had left the area to form households of their own. Declining numbers of children meant a reduced need for schools. This pattern of the ageing of the suburb was compounded by the fall in the birth rate compared to the baby boom of the postwar years. Schools closed and in a number of cases the sites were sold for housing, particularly medium-density housing. They became part of a general pattern in the late 1980s and 1990s where surplus government land from a number of uses was sold. The overall impact was generally to increase the density of housing in the older areas of the City of Monash.

Consequently, Syndal High School continued to operate in 1995 and the first semester of 1996 as a junior campus (years 7 and 8) of Glen Waverley Secondary College prior to closure, to allow for the completion of extensive building works at Glen Waverley's now only campus. The majority of the facilities were demolished and replaced with new streets (Chesterville Rd, Kwinana Street, Knightsbridge, Epworth, Ingliss and Secomb Courts) and housing.

Students and staff from Syndal Secondary School along with those from what was the Lawrence Secondary College (formerly Syndal Technical School) were transferred to the now much larger Glen Waverley Secondary College.

All that remains of the school is what was once the main hall. The W.M. Zimmer Hall is a community facility named after a long-serving school Principal. The hall now resides in the grounds of Glendal Primary School.

References

Further reading 
 Monash City Council - State Schools
 Monash City Council - Secondary Schools

Secondary schools in Melbourne
Educational institutions established in 1967
1967 establishments in Australia
Glen Waverley, Victoria
Buildings and structures in the City of Monash